Khurtay (also Romanized as Khūrtāy) is a village in Ahandan Rural District, in the Central District of Lahijan County, Gilan Province, Iran. At the 2006 census, its population was 121, in 29 families.

References 

Populated places in Lahijan County